Abdulaziz Husain Haikal Mubarak Al-Balooshi (born 10 September 1990) is an Emirati professional association football player who plays for Shabab Al-Ahli. He competed at the 2012 Summer Olympics.

Honours
Shabab Al Ahli
 UAE President's Cup: 2018–19
 UAE League Cup: 2018–19
 UAE Super Cup: 2020
Al Ahli
 UAE Pro League: 2013–14, 2015–16
 UAE President's Cup: 2012–13
 UAE League Cup: 20011–12, 2013–14, 2016–17
 UAE Super Cup: 2013, 2014, 2016
UAE
 AFC Asian Cup third-place: 2015
AFC U-19 Championship: 2008

References

1990 births
Living people
Emirati footballers
Olympic footballers of the United Arab Emirates
Footballers at the 2012 Summer Olympics
2015 AFC Asian Cup players
United Arab Emirates international footballers
Association football defenders
Asian Games medalists in football
Footballers at the 2010 Asian Games
Al Shabab Al Arabi Club Dubai players
Al Ahli Club (Dubai) players
Asian Games silver medalists for the United Arab Emirates
Emirati people of Baloch descent
Shabab Al-Ahli Club players
UAE Pro League players
Medalists at the 2010 Asian Games